Aiouea bracteata is a species of plant in the family Lauraceae. It is endemic to Brazil.

References

bracteata
Flora of Brazil
Vulnerable plants
Taxonomy articles created by Polbot
Plants described in 1938
Taxa named by André Joseph Guillaume Henri Kostermans
Flora of the Cerrado
Flora of the Atlantic Forest